Recommendation G.9963 is a home networking standard under development at the International Telecommunication Union standards sector, the ITU-T.

It was begun in 2010 by ITU-T to add multiple-input and multiple-output (known as MIMO) capabilities to the G.hn standard originally defined in Recommendation G.9960. The standard is also known as "G.hn-mimo".

As part of the family of G.hn standards, G.9963 was endorsed by the HomeGrid Forum.

References  

Networking standards
Network protocols
Open standards
International standards
Computer networks
Internet Standards
ITU-T recommendations
ITU-T G Series Recommendations